Corta Jaca may refer to:

Corta Jaca (dance), a traditional Brazilian dance
Corta Jaca (ballroom Maxixe), a dance step described for the version of Maxixe in North American and Merican ballrooms
Corta Jaca (samba step), a step from the syllabus of the International Style ballroom samba
Corta Jaca (song), a song by Chiquinha Gonzaga